Higgins Independent School District was a public school district based in Higgins, Texas (USA).

In addition to Higgins, the district also served the community of Lipscomb.

Higgins ISD had one school, Higgins School, that served students in grades pre-kindergarten through twelve.

History
A resident who talked to KFDA stated that beginning in 1982, rumors circulated about an imminent closure of the district. In 2020 the superintendent recommended that the district consolidate as the Higgins ISD finances and student enrollment had declined.

The district consolidated with Canadian ISD on July 1, 2020.

Academic achievement
In 2009, the school district was rated "academically acceptable" by the Texas Education Agency.

Special programs

Athletics
Higgins High and junior high Schools played six-man football.
Boys and girls basketball.
Track.
Tennis. 
Cross country.

The Higgins Coyotes competed in these sports - 

Basketball
Cross Country
6-Man Football
Golf
Tennis
Track and Field

See also

List of school districts in Texas
List of six-man football venues in Texas

References

External links
Higgins ISD

Former school districts in Texas
School districts in Lipscomb County, Texas
2020 disestablishments in Texas
Schools in Lipscomb County, Texas
Public K-12 schools in Texas
Defunct schools in Texas
School districts disestablished in 2020